The 1911–12 season was Manchester United's 20th season in the Football League and fifth in the First Division.

FA Charity Shield

First Division

FA Cup

References

Manchester United F.C. seasons
Manchester United